The Slovene Prealps or the Slovenian Prealps are a group of mountain ranges in the eastern part of the Alps. They are located in Slovenia and, for a small part of their northernmost area, in Austria.

Geography

SOIUSA classification 
According to SOIUSA (International Standardized Mountain Subdivision of the Alps) the Slovene Prealps are an Alpine section, classified in the following way:
 main part = Eastern Alps
 major sector = Southern Limestone Alps
 section = Slovene Prealps
 code = II/C-36

Subdivision 
The Slovene Prealps are divided into three non-contiguous subsections:

 Western Slovene Prealps (Sl: Zahodne Slovenske Predalpe) - SOIUSA code:II/C-36.I
 Eastern Slovene Prealps (Sl: Vzhodne Slovenske Predalpe) - SOIUSA code:II/C-36.II
 Northeastern Slovene Prealps (Sl: Severovzhodne Slovenske Predalpe) - SOIUSA code:II/C-36.III

Two of these subsections include just one Alpine supergroup, and the third one is further subdivided in two supergroups:
 Western Slovene Prealps:
 supergroup Škofjeloško-Cerkljansko-Polhograjsko-Rovtarsko hribovje - SOIUSA code:II/C-36.I-A
 Eastern Slovene Prealps:
 supergroup Posavsko hribovje - SOIUSA code:II/C-36.II-A
 Northeastern Slovene Prealps:
 supergroup Strojno s Pohorjem hribovje - SOIUSA code:II/C-36.III-A
 supergroup Vitanjsko-Konjiško hribovje - SOIUSA code:II/C-36.III-B

Summits
The chief summits of the Slovene Prealps are:

References

Mountain ranges of Slovenia
Mountain ranges of Austria
Mountain ranges of the Alps